Marie-Emilie Maryon de Montanclos (1736-1812), was a French feminist, journalist, poet, playwright, and editor. She was the director of the women's magazine Journal des dames (1759–78)

Life and career

De Montanclos was born in Aix-en-Provence in 1736. Her first marriage ended with her husband's death, and her second marriage ended in a legal separation. In 1774, she became editor of Journal des dames. In this role, she attempted to further its feminist aims, and used her position to seek support for social reforms.

Later, de Montanclos became director of the Théâtre Montansier at Versailles. Between 1782 and 1804, she wrote a number of comedy plays, some of which were performed.

References 

1736 births
1812 deaths
18th-century French businesswomen
18th-century French businesspeople
Women printers
18th-century French journalists
18th-century French writers
18th-century French women writers
French women editors
French novelists
18th-century women journalists
19th-century women journalists